Stormbukta is a bay in Sørkapp Land at Spitsbergen, Svalbard. It is located at the western shore of Spitsbergen, extending from Olsokneset northwards to  Bjørnbeinflya. The bay is named after Arctic explorer Erik Storm. The glaciers Olsokbreen and Sørkappfonna debouch into the bay.

References

Bays of Spitsbergen